Aaron Cohen may refer to:
Aaron Cohen (actor) (born 1976)
Aaron Cohen (Deputy NASA administrator) (1931–2010)
Aaron Cohen's Debt, a 1999 Israeli film
Aaron Cohen (judoka)
Aaron Cohen (rapper)

Human name disambiguation pages